Larbi Zekkal (19 May 1934 – 17 September 2010) was an Algerian film actor and comedian.

Personal life
Larbi Zekkal was born on May 19, 1934 in Algiers, Algeria. He died on September 17, 2010 in Algiers, Algeria at age 76 after falling from his balcony, and was buried in the Sidi M’hamed cemetery.

Acting career
Zekkal began his acting career in the 1950s and played in many different movies, with his most notable role coming in The Battle of Algiers. He also played a role in the French movie Bâton Rouge which was directed by  Rachid Bouchareb. He also had a role in Si Mohand U Mhand, l’insoumis. Zekkal's last role was in the French drama Outside the Law (Hors-La-Loi), which was released in 2010.

References

External links
 

1934 births
2010 deaths
Algerian male film actors
People from Algiers
Accidental deaths from falls
Accidental deaths in Algeria
Algerian male comedians
20th-century Algerian male actors
21st-century Algerian male actors